Martina Anna Tkadlec Strong an American diplomat who is the nominee to be the next United States Ambassador to the United Arab Emirates.

Early life and education
Strong earned her B.A. degree from Southern Methodist University and her M.A. degree from the University of California, Berkeley.

Career
Strong is a career member of the Senior Foreign Service, with the rank of Minister-Counselor. She currently serves as the Chargé d’affaires, ad interim at the U.S. Embassy in Saudi Arabia. She previously served as the Deputy Chief of Mission and also Chargé d’affaires, ad interim at the U.S. Embassy in Sofia, Bulgaria, and she also served as the Minister Counselor for Political and Political-Military Affairs at the U.S. Embassy in Baghdad, Iraq. Strong served as Counselor for Political-Economic Affairs at the U.S. Embassy in Warsaw, Poland, and as a Political Advisor in Basra, Iraq. Strong also was the Deputy Counselor for Political-Economic Affairs at the U.S. Embassies in Prague, Czech Republic and in Bridgetown, Barbados. Domestically, she served as Director for the G-8 on the White House National Security Council in Washington, D.C.

She has been Chargé d’affaires to Saudi Arabia since January 20, 2021.

Nominee as Ambassador to the United Arab Emirates
On September 16, 2022, President Joe Biden nominated Strong to be the next ambassador to the United Arab Emirates. Her nomination expired at the end of the year and was returned to President Biden on January 3, 2023.

President Biden renominated Strong the same day. Her nomination is pending before the Senate Foreign Relations Committee.

Personal life
Strong speaks Arabic, Czech, Polish, French, German, Russian, and Bosnian.

References

Year of birth missing (living people)
American women ambassadors
United States Foreign Service personnel
Southern Methodist University alumni
University of California, Berkeley alumni
Ambassadors of the United States to Saudi Arabia
Ambassadors of the United States to Bulgaria
American women diplomats